Jiangling Motors Corporation Limited,  abbreviated JMC, is a Chinese automobile manufacturer. According to company and press reports, the largest shareholder of JMC is Jiangling Investment, a company controlled equally by the state-owned enterprises Changan and Jiangling Motors Corporation Group (JMCG).

History 
The history of Jiangling Motors Corporation (JMC) can be traced to a truck repair shop opened in Nanchang in 1947 which operated under the name Nanchang Motors Repair Factory. A JMC predecessor started assembling vehicles in 1968. The company was granted the approval of Jiangxi Province Economic Restructuring Commission to be reorganized to establish a joint stock limited company on February 20, 1993. JMC A shares and B shares were listed on Shenzhen Stock Exchange on December 1, 1993, and September 29, 1995, respectively.

In the 1990s, Ford lost a bid against American rival General Motors for getting a joint venture deal with the Chinese manufacturer SAIC Motor. In 1995, as part of its push for getting new Chinese partners, Ford acquired B shares equivalent to a 20% equity in JMC, becoming the second-largest shareholder. In 1996, JMC began selling its products in overseas markets, initially Egypt and the Middle East. , the largest overseas market by volume for JMC is Chile. In 1997, JMC and Ford started the production of their first joint product, the Ford Transit, with JMC supplying various key components (as engines and axles) and Ford the design. In 1998, after JMC issued additional B shares, Ford upped its stake to 30%. In 2013, Ford purchased more B shares, increasing its stake to over 30%.

In late 2010, Jiangling released the first passenger vehicle of JMC under the newly launched JMC Yusheng sub-brand, the Yusheng S350 SUV.

In 2013, JMC reorganized the heavy truck manufacturer Changan Taiyuan as a wholly owned subsidiary named JMC Heavy Duty Vehicle. In mid-2021, JMC Heavy Duty Vehicle was sold to Volvo Trucks.

In December 2021, JMC and Ford established a Shanghai-based joint venture focused on the production of passenger cars. The venture is called Jiangling Ford Motor Technology (Shanghai) Company (Jiangling Ford). JMC owns a 51% and Ford a 49% of its stake.

Production

Production bases 
JMC produces vehicles under the JMC, JMC Yusheng and Ford brands. It has assembly plants around Nanchang (at Qingyunpu and the Xiaolan Economic Zone). JMC also has a new energy vehicle plant (the Fushan plant) in the Xiaolan Economic Zone.

Products

JMC (Jiangling) 
A brand mainly for commercial vehicles

 JMC Teshun – Van
 Jiangling CV9 minivan
 JMC BaoWei (SUV)
 JMC pickup
 JMC Boarding (JMC Baodian) pickup
 JMC Yuhu pickup
 JMC Yuhu 3 pickup
 JMC Yuhu 5 pickup
 JMC Yuhu 7 pickup
 JMC Yuhu 9 pickup
 JMC Yuhu EV pickup
 JMC Qingka (Jiangling Light Truck) (small truck) – light trucks series
 JMC Convey (Kaiwei)
 JMC Conquer (Kairui and Kairui 800)
 JMC Carrying (Kaiyun)
 JMC Shunda
 JMC Yunba (commercial van)
JMC E-Lushun  (electric van for logistics)

Yusheng 

A brand for passenger vehicles.
 Yusheng S330 CUV
 Yusheng S350 SUV

Licensed Ford production 
 JMC Transit (minibus, developed by Ford and JMC jointly)
 JMC E-series SVO – based on Ford E-series vans:
 E350 Communication/Command Vehicle
 E250 Luxury Business Vehicle
 E350 Investigation Vehicle
 E350 Anti-riot Assault Vehicle
 Ford Equator
 Ford Equator Sport
 Ford Everest
 Ford Territory

New energy vehicle 
 Yusheng S330 EV/PHEV (proposed)

See also 
List of Chinese auto companies

Notes

References

External links 

Official website of Jiangling Motors

Truck manufacturers of China
Electric vehicle manufacturers of China
Companies based in Jiangxi
Vehicle manufacturing companies established in 1993
Ford Motor Company
Chinese brands
1993 establishments in China
Jiangling Motors Corporation Group
Changan Automobile
Bus manufacturers of China